Edmund Andrews may refer to:
Edmund Andrews (surgeon) (1824–1904), American surgeon
Edmund L. Andrews, journalist and author